General elections were held in Antigua and Barbuda on 18 February 1976. Whilst the Progressive Labour Movement received the most votes, the opposition Antigua Labour Party won more than double the number of seats. ALP leader Vere Bird was elected Premier of Antigua. Bird had previously served as head of government of Antigua and Barbuda between 1960 and 1971. He defeated the incumbent Premier George Walter of the Progressive Labour Movement.

The elections marked the second change of government in the history of Antigua and Barbuda. Voter turnout was 95%.

Results

References

Elections in Antigua and Barbuda
Antigua
1976 in Antigua and Barbuda
February 1976 events in North America